Youn Yuh-jung (born June 19, 1947) is a South Korean actress, whose career in film and television spans over five decades. Her accolades include an Academy Award, a Screen Actors Guild Award, a British Academy Film Award, two Independent Spirit Awards, and a nomination for a Critics' Choice Movie Award. She has starred in many South Korean television series and films.

She gained international recognition for her role in Minari (2020). Her critically acclaimed portrayal of Soon-ja in the film made her the first Korean actress to win a Screen Actors Guild Award, an Independent Spirit Award, a British Academy Film Award, and an Academy Award, as well as the first to be nominated for a Critics' Choice Movie Award, all in the Best Supporting Actress category.

By the late 1960s, Youn was a rising star in South Korea and won several awards for her role in Woman of Fire (1971). She retired from the spotlight for several years before returning to acting in the late 1980s. Besides Woman of Fire and Minari, Youn is known for her work in the South Korean films The Housemaid (2010), The Taste of Money (2012), The Bacchus Lady (2016), and Canola (2016). She is also known for her matriarch roles in the South Korean family drama series Men of the Bath House (1995), Be Strong Geum Soon (2005), Daughters-in-Law (2007), My Husband Got a Family (2012), and Dear My Friends (2016). In 2022, she appeared in the television series Pachinko on Apple TV+.

Early and personal life
Youn Yuh jung was born on June 19, 1947 in Kaesong (today in North Korea), Gyeonggi Province, and grew up in Seoul. Her father died when she was young. She has two sisters. Her sister Youn Yeo-soon is a former executive at LG Group. She attended high school at Ewha Girls' High School, and enrolled at Hanyang University majoring in Korean Language and Literature, when she passed the open auditions held by TBC in 1966.

Youn has two sons, both of whom are Korean-Americans.

Career 
She dropped out of college, and made her acting debut in the television drama Mister Gom in 1967. Youn shot to stardom in 1971 with two memorable portrayals of femme fatales. Her first film, Kim Ki-young's Woman of Fire, became a critical and commercial hit, for which she won Best Actress at the Sitges Film Festival.

This was followed by the MBC historical drama Jang Hui-bin where she played the titular infamous royal concubine. Kim was considered Korea's first style-conscious, experimental director, and Youn did not balk in playing risque, provocative characters that explore the grotesque in the female psyche in collaborations with him such as The Insect Woman (1972) and Be a Wicked Woman (1990). Audiences found Youn's fast way of speaking and atypical appearance refreshing and she frequently took roles in TV dramas depicting a modern woman of the new generation, notably in Stepmother (1972) written by Kim Soo-hyun.

At the peak of her career, Youn retired after she married singer Jo Young-nam in 1974, then immigrated to the United States. In 1984, she returned to Korea and permanently resumed her acting career. She and Jo divorced in 1987 and struggled to resume her acting career due to the stigma of divorce in South Korea.

Making a comeback after taking a long break was an unusual feat for a Korean middle-aged actress. Although most actresses her age played clichéd self-sacrificing mothers or coarse ajummas, Youn's acting range led to her being cast in more complex, stylish, and independent roles. In A Good Lawyer's Wife (2003), she drew critical acclaim for her nonchalant acting as a mother-in-law who neglected her husband dying of liver cancer and enjoyed extramarital affairs. Her frank and confident persona again manifested itself in E J-yong's mockumentary Actresses (2009).

Youn continued playing supporting roles in film and television, such as in The Housemaid (2010). She reunited with director Im Sang-soo for the fourth time in The Taste of Money (2012), as a cruel chaebol heiress at the center of the drama that unfolds and touches upon the themes of corruption, greed and sex. Youn said "I don't mind being called an old actress, but I do worry about how to carry on my acting career without looking like an old fool."

In 2013, she was cast as a loving mother to three loser children in Song Hae-sung's Boomerang Family. Later in the year, Youn appeared in her first reality show Sisters Over Flowers, a travel show shot in Croatia. After appearing on Sisters Over Flowers, Youn has stated that her public image became more positive.

Youn starred in two leading roles in 2015: Kang Je-gyu's Salut d'Amour about the romance between an elderly supermarket employee and a flower shop owner, and Canola about a Jeju Island female diver who reunites with her long-lost granddaughter. Salut d'Amour was Youn's first collaboration with actor Park Geun-hyung since 1971.

In 2020, she made her Hollywood debut in a supporting role as Soon-ja, a grandma of a Korean-American family in rural Arkansas, in the American film Minari, for which she received critical recognition from over forty American regional critics awards, including wins from the National Board of Review and the Los Angeles Film Critics Association. Youn went on to become the first Korean actress to win an Academy Award for Best Supporting Actress, SAG Award for Outstanding Performance by a Female Actor in a Supporting Role, and BAFTA Award for Best Actress in a Supporting Role. She was also the first Asian actress to win an acting award in the motion pictures categories at the Screen Actors Guild Awards as well as the first Korean actress to win an Academy Award and first Asian actress to win an Academy Award since 1958 when Miyoshi Umeki won Best Supporting Actress for Sayonara.

In April 2021, Film at Lincoln Center hosted a five film retrospective of her career. In September 2021, she was selected as one of the 100 most "Influential People in the World" in 2021 by the American weekly magazine TIME. She was named in the 'Titan' category. Youn received the Order of Cultural Merit.

In December 2022, Youn's contract with Hook Entertainment ended, and she decided not to renew after 5 years. Later, in January 2023, Youn signed with Creative Artists Agency.

Filmography

Film

Television series

Variety show

Awards and nominations

Listicles

State honors

Notes

References

External links 
 
 
 

1947 births
Living people
20th-century South Korean actresses
21st-century South Korean actresses
Best Supporting Actress Academy Award winners
Best Supporting Actress Asian Film Award winners
Best Supporting Actress BAFTA Award winners
Independent Spirit Award for Best Supporting Female winners
Outstanding Performance by a Female Actor in a Supporting Role Screen Actors Guild Award winners
People from Gyeonggi Province
People from Kaesong
South Korean film actresses
South Korean television actresses
South Korean television personalities
Recipients of the Order of Cultural Merit (Korea)
Papyeong Yun clan